The fencing competitions at the 2020 Summer Olympics in Tokyo featured 12 events, the first time that both team and individual events have been held in all three weapons for both men and women.

Originally scheduled for 25 July to 2 August 2020, the games were postponed due to the COVID-19 pandemic and rescheduled to 24 July to 1 August 2021.

Qualification

There were 200 quota spots for fencing at the 2020 Summer Olympics. Qualification were primarily based on the Fédération Internationale d'Escrime (FIE) Official Ranking as of 4 April 2020, with further individual places available at 4 zonal qualifying tournaments.

For the team events, 8 teams qualify in each event. Each team must be composed of at least 3 fencers. The top 4 ranked teams qualify. The next-best ranked team from each zone (Africa, the Americas, Europe, and Asia-Oceania) will qualify as long as it is ranked in the top 16. If a zone does not have any teams ranked between 5th and 16th, the best-placed team not already qualified will be selected regardless of zone.

For individual events, the 3 fencers from the team event qualify for individual competition automatically. Six more places will be awarded based on the rankings (ignoring fencers from countries with team qualifications, and considering only the top fencer from each country): the top 2 fencers from each of Europe and Asia-Oceania, and the top 1 fencer from each of Americas and Africa, qualify. 4 more places (1 per zone) will be awarded through zone qualifying tournaments; only countries without a qualified fencer in an event will be eligible to participate in these zone qualifying tournaments.

The host country, Japan, is guaranteed a minimum of 8 quota spots.

Participating nations
261 athletes from 42 nations competed at the Olympics in the fencing event.

 Hosts

Schedule

Sources: Olympian Database, Olympics.com

Medal summary

Medal table

Medalists

Men's

Sources: Olympics.com

Women's

Sources: Olympics.com

See also
Fencing at the 2018 Asian Games
Fencing at the 2018 Summer Youth Olympics
Fencing at the 2019 African Games
Fencing at the 2019 Pan American Games
Wheelchair fencing at the 2020 Summer Paralympics

References

External links
International Fencing Federation
 Results book 

 
2020
2020 Summer Olympics events
International fencing competitions hosted by Japan
2021 in fencing